In the mid 1970s the Toronto Transit Commission ran heritage streetcars on the
remaining portions of the Toronto Railway Company Belt Line.
The picturesque heritage vehicles were meant to please tourists.
Riders paid a regular fare, and were issued transfers which would allow them to board other TTC vehicles.
The service only ran during the summer.

The TTC provided a guide to give passengers historical commentary.

References

Transport in Toronto